Duparquet is a ville in northwestern Quebec, Canada in the MRC d'Abitibi-Ouest.

History

In 1912, a rich gold vein was discovered near Lake Duparquet by a prospector named Beattie. He set up the Beattie Gold Mine company that began operation in 1933. That same year, the new community forming at the mine was incorporated as Ville de Duparquet, named after the geographic township in which it is located. The township was named in 1916 in honour of Jean-Annet Chabreuil Du Parquet, a grenadier captain of the La Sarre Regiment, that was part of General Montcalm's army.

After producing 1 million ounces of gold and killing at least 27 miners, including 4 in a landslide on 9 July 1946, the mine closed in 1956. But the owners of the mining rights are currently considering reopening it as an open-pit mine.

Demographics 

Mother tongue:
 English as first language: 1.49%
 French as first language: 97.76%
 English and French as first language: 0.75%
 Other as first language: 0%

Notable people 
 Birthplace of Chicago Black Hawks player Elmer "Moose" Vasko of the 1960s.
 Johanne Morasse (born March 12, 1957), a Quebec politician and teacher
 Tim Horton, hockey player and entrepreneur, lived in Duparquet as a child

Municipal council
 Mayor: Gilbert Rivard
 Councillors:  Denis Blais, Sylvain Audet, Claudette Macameau, Marlène Doroftei, Jacques Ricard, Solange Gamache
 General Director: Chantal Poirier

References

Cities and towns in Quebec
Incorporated places in Abitibi-Témiscamingue
Populated places established in 1933